Yaqoob Abdul-Karim Salim Al Qasmi (born 4 September 1985), commonly known as Yaqoob Al-Qasmi, is an Omani footballer who plays for Saham SC.

Club career
On 23 July 2013, he agreed a one-year contract extension with Saham SC. On 2 July 2014, he agreed a one-year contract extension with 2014 GCC Champions League runners-up Saham SC.

Club career statistics

International career
Yaqoob is part of the first team squad of the Oman national football team. He was selected for the national team for the first time in 2009. He made his first appearance for Oman on 17 November 2009 in a friendly match against Brazil. He has made appearances in the 2010 Gulf Cup of Nations, the 2011 AFC Asian Cup qualification, the 2012 WAFF Championship, the 2014 FIFA World Cup qualification, the 2013 Gulf Cup of Nations and the 2015 AFC Asian Cup qualification.

National team career statistics

Goals for Senior National Team
Scores and results list Oman's goal tally first.

Honours

Club
With Saham
Omani Super Cup (1): 2010
Oman Professional League Cup (1): 2013; Runner-up 2012

References

External links
 
 
 
 
 
 Yaqoob Abdul-Karim - ASIAN CUP Australia 2015

Living people
Omani footballers
Oman international footballers
Association football forwards
2015 AFC Asian Cup players
Saham SC players
Oman Professional League players
20th-century births
Year of birth missing (living people)